Mikhail Afanasyevich Bulgakov (– 10 March 1940) was a Russian, later Soviet writer, medical doctor, and playwright active in the first half of the 20th century. He is best known for his novel The Master and Margarita, published posthumously, which has been called one of the masterpieces of the 20th century.

He is also known for his novel The White Guard; his plays Ivan Vasilievich, Flight (also called The Run), and The Days of the Turbins; and other works of the 1920s and 1930s. He wrote mostly about the horrors of the Russian Civil War and about the fate of Russian intellectuals and officers of the Tsarist Army caught up in revolution and Civil War.

Some of his works (Flight, all his works between the years 1922 and 1926, and others) were banned by the Soviet government, and personally by Joseph Stalin, after it was decided by them that they "glorified emigration and White generals". On the other hand, Stalin loved The Days of the Turbins (also called  The Turbin Brothers) very much and reportedly saw it at least 15 times.

Life and work

Early life

He was one of the seven children (the oldest of three brothers) of  a state councilor, a professor at the Kiev Theological Academy, as well as a prominent Russian Orthodox essayist, thinker and translator of religious texts. His mother was Varvara Mikhailovna Bulgakova (nee Pokrovskaya), a former teacher. Both of his grandfathers were clergymen in the Russian Orthodox Church.

Afanasiy Bulgakov was born in Bryansk Oblast, Russia, where his father was a priest, and he moved to Kiev to study in the academy. Varvara Bulgakova was born in Karachev, Russia. According to Edythe C. Haber, in his "autobiographical remarks" Bulgakov stated that she was a descendant of Tartar hordes, which supposedly influenced some of his works. From childhood, Bulgakov was drawn to theater. At home, he wrote comedies, which his brothers and sisters acted out.

In 1901, Bulgakov joined the First Kiev Gymnasium, where he developed an interest in Russian and European literature (his favourite authors at the time being Gogol, Pushkin, Dostoyevsky, Saltykov-Shchedrin, and Dickens), theatre and opera. The teachers of the Gymnasium exerted a great influence on the formation of his literary taste. After the death of his father in 1907, Mikhail's mother, a well-educated and extraordinarily diligent person, assumed responsibility for his education. After graduation from the Gymnasium in 1909, Bulgakov entered the Medical Faculty of Kiev University, which he finished with special commendation. He then took a position as a physician at the Kiev Military Hospital.

In 1913, Bulgakov married Tatiana Lappa. At the outbreak of the First World War, he volunteered with the Red Cross as a medical doctor and was sent directly to the front, where he was badly injured at least twice. Bulgakov's suffering from these wounds had deleterious long-term effects. To suppress chronic pain, especially in the abdomen, he injected himself with morphine. Over the next year his addiction grew stronger. In 1918, he abandoned morphine and never used it again. Morphine, a book released in 1926, is his account of that trying period.

In 1916, Bulgakov graduated from the Medical Department of Kiev University and after serving as a surgeon at Chernovtsy hospital, was appointed provincial physician to Smolensk province. His life in those days is reflected in his A Country Doctor's Notebook. In September 1917, Bulgakov was moved to the hospital in Vyazma, near Smolensk. In February 1918, he returned to Kiev, Ukraine, where he opened a private practice at his home at Andreyevsky Descent, 13. Here he lived through the Civil War and witnessed ten coups. Successive governments drafted the young doctor into their service while two of his brothers were serving in the White Army against the Bolsheviks.

In February 1919, he was mobilised as an army physician by the White Army and assigned to the Northern Caucasus. There, he became seriously ill with typhus and barely survived. In the Caucasus, he started working as a journalist, but when he and others were invited to return as doctors by the French and German governments, Bulgakov was refused permission to leave Russia because of the typhus. That was when he last saw his family; after the Civil War and the rise of the Soviets most of his relatives emigrated to Paris.

Career
After his illness, Bulgakov abandoned his medical practice to pursue writing. In his autobiography, he recalled how he began: "Once in 1919 when I was traveling at night by train I wrote a short story. In the town where the train stopped, I took the story to the publisher of the newspaper who published the story". His first book was an almanac of feuilletons called Future Perspectives, written and published the same year. In December 1919, Bulgakov moved to Vladikavkaz. He wrote and saw his first two plays, Self Defence and The Turbin Brothers, being produced for the city theater stage with great success.

After travelling through the Caucasus, Bulgakov headed for Moscow, intending "to remain here forever". It was difficult to find work in the capital, but he was appointed secretary to the literary section of Glavpolitprosvet (Central Committee of the Republic for Political Education). In September 1921, Bulgakov and his wife settled near Patriarch's Ponds, on Bolshaya Sadovaya street, 10 (now close to Mayakovskaya metro station). To make a living, he started working as a correspondent and feuilletons writer for the newspapers Gudok, Krasnaia Panorama and Nakanune, based in Berlin. For the almanac Nedra, he wrote  Diaboliad, The Fatal Eggs (1924), and Heart of a Dog (1925), works that combined bitter satire and elements of science fiction and were concerned with the fate of a scientist and the misuse of his discovery. The most significant features of Bulgakov's satire, such as a skillful blending of fantastic and realistic elements, grotesque situations, and a concern with important ethical issues, had already taken shape; these features were developed further in his most famous novel.

Between 1922 and 1926, Bulgakov wrote several plays (including Zoyka's Apartment), none of which were allowed production at the time. The Run, treating the horrors of a fratricidal war, was personally banned by Joseph Stalin after the Glavrepertkom (Department of Repertoire) decided that it "glorified emigration and White generals". In 1924, Bulgakov divorced his first wife and the next year married Lyubov Belozerskaya.

When one of Moscow's theatre directors severely criticised Bulgakov, Stalin personally protected him, saying that a writer of Bulgakov's quality was above "party words" like "left" and "right". Stalin found work for the playwright at a small Moscow theatre, and next the Moscow Art Theatre (MAT). Bulgakov's first major work was the novel The White Guard (Belaya gvardiya [Белая гвардия]), serialized in 1925 but never published in book form. 
On 5 October 1926, The Days of the Turbins, the play which continued the theme of The White Guard (the fate of Russian intellectuals and officers of the Tsarist Army caught up in revolution and Civil war) was premiered at the MAT. Stalin liked it very much and reportedly saw it at least 15 times.

His plays Ivan Vasilievich (Иван Васильевич), Don Quixote (Дон Кихот) and Last Days (Последние дни [Poslednie Dni], also called Pushkin) were banned. The premier of another, Moliėre (also known as The Cabal of Hypocrites), about the French dramatist in which Bulgakov plunged "into fairy Paris of the XVII century", received bad reviews in Pravda and the play was withdrawn from the theater repertoire. In 1928, Zoyka's Apartment and The Purple Island were staged in Moscow; both comedies were accepted by the public with great enthusiasm, but critics again gave them bad reviews. By March 1929, Bulgakov's career was ruined when  Government censorship stopped the publication of any of his work and his plays.

In despair, Bulgakov first wrote a personal letter to Joseph Stalin (July 1929), then on 28 March 1930, a letter to the Soviet government. He requested permission to emigrate if the Soviet Union could not find use for him as a writer. In his autobiography, Bulgakov claimed to have written to Stalin out of desperation and mental anguish, never intending to post the letter. He received a phone call directly from the Soviet leader, who asked the writer whether he really desired to leave the Soviet Union. Bulgakov replied that a Russian writer cannot live outside of his homeland. Stalin gave him permission to continue working at the Art Theater; on 10 May 1930, he re-joined the theater, as stage director's assistant. Later he adapted Gogol's Dead Souls for stage.

In 1932, Bulgakov married for the third time, to Yelena Shilovskaya, who would prove to be inspiration for the character Margarita in his most famous novel, on which he started working in 1928.  During the last decade of his life, Bulgakov continued to work on The Master and Margarita, wrote plays, critical works, and stories and made several translations and dramatisations of novels. Many of them were not published, others were "torn to pieces" by critics. Much of his work (ridiculing the Soviet system) stayed in his desk drawer for several decades. The refusal of the authorities to let him work in the theatre and his desire to see his family who were living abroad, whom he had not seen for many years, led him to seek drastic measures. Despite his new work, the projects he worked on at the theatre were often prohibited, and he was stressed and unhappy.

Last years
In the late 1930s, he joined the Bolshoi Theatre as a librettist and consultant. He left after perceiving that none of his works would be produced there. Stalin's favor protected Bulgakov from arrests and execution, but he could not get his writing published. His novels and dramas were subsequently banned and, for the second time, Bulgakov's career as playwright was ruined. When his last play Batum (1939), a complimentary portrayal of Stalin's early revolutionary days, was banned before rehearsals, Bulgakov requested permission to leave the country but was refused.

In poor health, Bulgakov devoted his last years to what he called his "sunset" novel. The years 1937 to 1939 were stressful for Bulgakov, veering from glimpses of optimism, believing the publication of his masterpiece could still be possible, to bouts of depression, when he felt as if there were no hope. On 15 June 1938, when the manuscript was nearly finished, Bulgakov wrote in a letter to his wife:
"In front of me 327 pages of the manuscript (about 22 chapters). The most important remains – editing, and it's going to be hard, I will have to pay close attention to details. Maybe even re-write some things... 'What's its future?' you ask? I don't know. Possibly, you will store the manuscript in one of the drawers, next to my 'killed' plays, and occasionally it will be in your thoughts. Then again, you don't know the future. My own judgement of the book is already made and I think it truly deserves being hidden away in the darkness of some chest..."

In 1939, Mikhail Bulgakov organized a private reading of The Master and Margarita to his close circle of friends. Yelena Bulgakova remembered 30 years later, "When he finally finished reading that night, he said: 'Well, tomorrow I am taking the novel to the publisher!' and everyone was silent", "...Everyone sat paralyzed. Everything scared them. P. (P. A. Markov, in charge of the literature division of MAT) later at the door fearfully tried to explain to me that trying to publish the novel would cause terrible things", she wrote in her diary (14 May 1939).

In the last month of his life, friends and relatives were constantly on duty at his bedside. On 10 March 1940, Mikhail Afanasyevich Bulgakov died from nephrotic syndrome (an inherited kidney disorder). His father had died of the same disease, and from his youth Bulgakov had guessed his future mortal diagnosis. On 11 March, a civil funeral was held in the building of the Union of Soviet Writers. Before the funeral, the Moscow sculptor Sergey Merkurov removed the death mask from his face. He was buried in the Novodevichy Cemetery in Moscow.

Works

During his life, Bulgakov was best known for the plays he contributed to Konstantin Stanislavski's and Nemirovich-Danchenko's Moscow Art Theatre. Stalin was known to be fond of the play Days of the Turbins (Дни Турбиных, 1926), which was based on Bulgakov's novel The White Guard. His dramatization of Molière's life in The Cabal of Hypocrites (Кабала святош, 1936) is still performed by the Moscow Art Theatre. Even after his plays were banned from the theatres, Bulgakov wrote a comedy about Ivan the Terrible's visit into 1930s Moscow. His play Batum (Батум, 1939) about the early years of Stalin was prohibited by the premier himself. Bulgakov later reflected his experience of being a Soviet playwright in Theatrical Novel (Театральный роман, 1936, unfinished). 

Bulgakov began writing novels with The White Guard (Белая гвардия) (1923, partly published in 1925, first full edition 1927–1929, Paris) – a novel about a life of a White Army officer's family in civil war Kiev. In the mid-1920s, he came to admire the works of Alexander Belyaev and H. G. Wells and wrote several stories and novellas with elements of science fiction, notably The Fatal Eggs (Роковые яйца) (1924) and Heart of a Dog (Собачье сердце) (1925). He intended to compile his stories of the mid-twenties (published mostly in medical journals) that were based on his work as a country doctor in 1916–1918 into a collection titled Notes of a Young Doctor (Записки юного врача), but the book came out only in 1963.

The Fatal Eggs tells of the events of a Professor Persikov, who, in experimentation with eggs, discovers a red ray that accelerates growth in living organisms. At the time, an illness passes through the chickens of Moscow, killing most of them, and to remedy the situation, the Soviet government puts the ray into use at a farm. Due to a mix-up in egg shipments, the Professor ends up with chicken eggs, while the government-run farm receives the shipment of ostrich, snake and crocodile eggs ordered by the Professor. The mistake is not discovered until the eggs produce giant monstrosities that wreak havoc in the suburbs of Moscow and kill most of the workers on the farm. The propaganda machine turns on Persikov, distorting his nature in the same way his "innocent" tampering created the monsters. This tale of a bungling government earned Bulgakov his label of counter-revolutionary.

Heart of a Dog features a professor who implants human testicles and a pituitary gland into a dog named Sharik (means "Little Balloon" or "Little Ball" – a popular Russian nickname for a male dog). The dog becomes more and more human as time passes, resulting in all manner of chaos. The tale can be read as a critical satire of liberal nihilism and the communist mentality. It contains a few bold hints to the communist leadership; e.g. the name of the drunkard donor of the human organ implants is Chugunkin ("chugun" is cast iron) which can be seen as a parody on the name of Stalin ("stal'" is steel). It was adapted as a comic opera called The Murder of Comrade Sharik by William Bergsma in 1973. In 1988, an award-winning film version Sobachye Serdtse was produced by Lenfilm, starring Yevgeniy Yevstigneyev, Roman Kartsev and Vladimir Tolokonnikov.

The Master and Margarita 

The novel The Master and Margarita is a critique of Soviet society and its literary establishment. The work is appreciated for its philosophical undertones and for its high artistic level, thanks to its picturesque descriptions (especially of old Jerusalem), lyrical fragments and style. It is a frame narrative involving two characteristically related time periods, or plot lines: a retelling in Bulgakov's interpretation of the New Testament and a description of contemporary Moscow.

The novel begins with Satan visiting Moscow in the 1930s, joining a conversation between a critic and a poet debating the most effective method of denying the existence of Jesus Christ. It develops into an all-embracing indictment of the corruption of communism and Soviet Russia. A story within the story portrays the interrogation of Jesus Christ by Pontius Pilate and the Crucifixion.

It became the best known novel by Bulgakov. He began writing it in 1928, but the novel was finally published by his widow only in 1966, twenty-six years after his death. The book contributed a number of sayings to the Russian language, for example, "Manuscripts don't burn" and "second-grade freshness". A destroyed manuscript of the Master is an important element of the plot. Bulgakov had to rewrite the novel from memory after he burned the draft manuscript in 1930, as he could not see a future as a writer in the Soviet Union at a time of widespread political repression.

Legacy

Exhibitions and museums
Several displays at the One Street Museum are dedicated to Bulgakov's family. Among the items presented in the museum are original photos of Mikhail Bulgakov, books and his personal belongings, and a window frame from the house where he lived. The museum also keeps scientific works of Prof. Afanasiy Bulgakov, Mikhail's father.

Mikhail Bulgakov Museum, Kyiv
The Mikhail Bulgakov Museum (Bulgakov House) in Kyiv has been converted to a literary museum with some rooms devoted to the writer, as well as some to his works.  This was his family home, the model for the house of the Turbin family in his play

The Bulgakov Museums in Moscow
In Moscow, two museums honour the memory of Mikhail Bulgakov and The Master and Margarita. Both are situated in Bulgakov's old apartment building on Bolshaya Sadovaya street nr. 10, in which parts of The Master and Margarita are set. Since the 1980s, the building has become a gathering spot for Bulgakov's fans, as well as Moscow-based Satanist groups, and had various kinds of graffiti scrawled on the walls. The numerous paintings, quips, and drawings were completely whitewashed in 2003. Previously the best drawings were kept as the walls were repainted, so that several layers of different colored paints could be seen around the best drawings.

There is a rivalry between the two museums, mainly maintained by the later established official Museum M.A. Bulgakov, which invariably presents itself as "the first and only Memorial Museum of Mikhail Bulgakov in Moscow".

The Bulgakov House

The Bulgakov House (Russian: Музей – театр "Булгаковский Дом") is situated at the ground floor. This museum has been established as a private initiative on 15 May 2004.

The Bulgakov House contains personal belongings, photos, and several exhibitions related to Bulgakov's life and his different works. Various poetic and literary events are often held, and excursions to Bulgakov's Moscow are organised, some of which are animated with living characters of The Master and Margarita. The Bulgakov House also runs the Theatre M.A. Bulgakov with 126 seats, and the Café 302-bis.

The Museum M.A. Bulgakov

In the same building, in apartment number 50 on the fourth floor, is a second museum that keeps alive the memory of Bulgakov, the Museum M.A. Bulgakov (Russian: Музей М. А. Булгаков). This second museum is a government initiative, and was founded on 26 March 2007.

The Museum M.A. Bulgakov contains personal belongings, photos, and several exhibitions related to Bulgakov's life and his different works. Various poetic and literary events are often held.

Other places named after him
A minor planet, 3469 Bulgakov, discovered by the Soviet astronomer Lyudmila Georgievna Karachkina in 1982, is named after him.

Works inspired by him

Literature
Salman Rushdie said that The Master and Margarita was an inspiration for his novel The Satanic Verses (1988).
John Hodge's play Collaborators (2011) is a fictionalized account of the relationship between Bulgakov and Joseph Stalin, inspired by The Days of the Turbins and The White Guard.

Music
According to Mick Jagger, Master and Margarita was the inspiration for The Rolling Stones' "Sympathy for the Devil" (1968). 
The lyrics of Pearl Jam's song "Pilate", featured on their album Yield (1998), were inspired by Master and Margarita. The lyrics were written by the band's bassist Jeff Ament.
Alex Kapranos from Franz Ferdinand based "Love and Destroy" on the same book.

Film
The Flight (1970) — a two-part historical drama based on Bulgakov's Flight, The White Guard and Black Sea. It was the first Soviet adaptation of Bulgakov's writings directed by Aleksandr Alov and Vladimir Naumov, with Bulgakov's third wife Elena Bulgakova credited as a "literary consultant". The film was officially selected for the 1971 Cannes Film Festival.
The Master and Margaret (1972) — a joint Yugoslav-Italian drama directed by Aleksandar Petrović, the first adaptation of the novel of the same name, along with Pilate and Others. It was selected as the Yugoslav entry for the Best Foreign Language Film at the 45th Academy Awards, but was not accepted as a nominee.
Pilate and Others (1972) — a German TV drama directed by Andrzej Wajda, it was also a loose adaptation of The Master and Margarita novel. The film focused on the biblical part of the story, and the action was moved to the modern-day Frankfurt.
Ivan Vasilievich: Back to the Future (1973) — an adaptation of Bulgakov's science fiction/comedy play Ivan Vasilievich about an unexpected visit of Ivan the Terrible to the modern-day Moscow. It was directed by one of the leading Soviet comedy directors Leonid Gaidai. With 60.7 million viewers on the year of release it became the 17th most popular film ever produced in the USSR.
Dog's Heart (1976) — a joint Italian-German science fiction/comedy film directed by Alberto Lattuada. It was the first adaptation of the Heart of a Dog satirical novel about an old scientist who tries to grow a man out of a dog.
The Days of the Turbins (1976) — a three-part Soviet TV drama directed by Vladimir Basov. It was an adaptation of the play of the same name which, at the same time, was Bulgakov's stage adaptation of The White Guard novel.
Heart of a Dog (1988) — a Soviet black-and-white TV film directed by Vladimir Bortko, the second adaptation of the novel of the same name. Unlike the previous version, this film follows the original text closely, while also introducing characters, themes and dialogues featured in other Bulgakov's writings.
The Master and Margarita (1989) — a Polish TV drama in four parts directed by Maciej Wojtyszko. It was noted by critics as a very faithful adaptation of the original novel.
After the Revolution (1990) – a feature-length film created by András Szirtes, a Hungarian filmmaker, using a simple video camera, from 1987 to 1989. It is a very loose adaptation, but for all that, it is explicitly based on Bulgakov's novel, in a thoroughly experimental way. What you see in this film is documentary-like scenes shot in Moscow and Budapest, and New York, and these scenes are linked to the novel by some explicit links, and by these, the film goes beyond the level of being but a visual documentary which would only have reminded the viewer of The Master and Margarita.
Incident in Judaea, a 1991 film by Paul Bryers for Channel 4, focussing on the biblical parts of The Master and Margarita.
The Master and Margarita (1994) — Russian film directed by Yuri Kara in 1994 and released to public only in 2011. Known for a long, troubled post-production due to the director's resistance to cut about 80 minutes of the film on the producers' request, as well as copyright claims from the descendants of Elena Bulgakova (Shilovskaya).
The Master and Margarita (2005) — Russian TV mini-series directed by Vladimir Bortko and his second adaptation of Bulgakov's writings. Screened for Russia-1, it was seen by 40 million viewers on its initial release, becoming the most popular Russian TV series.
Morphine (2008) — Russian film directed by Aleksei Balabanov loosely based on Bulgakov's autobiographical short stories Morphine and A Country Doctor's Notebook. The screenplay was written by Balabanov's friend and regular collaborator Sergei Bodrov, Jr. before his tragic death in 2002.
The White Guard (2012) — Russian TV mini-series produced by Russia-1. The film was shot in Saint Petersburg and Kyiv and released to mostly negative reviews. In 2014 the Ukrainian Ministry of Culture banned the distribution of the film, claiming that it shows "contempt for the Ukrainian language, people and state".
A Young Doctor's Notebook (2012—2013) — British mini-series produced by BBC, with Jon Hamm and Daniel Radcliffe playing main parts. Unlike the Morphine film by Aleksei Balabanov that mixed drama and thriller, this version of A Country Doctor's Notebook was made as a black comedy.

Medical eponym
After graduating from the Medical School in 1909, he spent the early days of his career as a venereologist, rather than pursuing his goal of being a pediatrician, as syphilis was highly prevalent during those times. It was during those early years that he described the symptoms and characteristics of syphilis affecting the bones. He described the abnormal and concomitant change of the outline of the crests of the shin-bones with a pathological worm-eaten like appearance and creation of abnormal osteophytes in the bones of those suffering from later stages of syphilis. This became known as "Bulgakov's Sign" and is commonly used in the former Soviet states, but is known as the "Bandy Legs Sign" in the west.

Bibliography

Novels 
The White Guard (1925/1975)
The Master and Margarita (1940/1967)
Theatrical Novel (1936/1967, aka Black Snow)

Novellas and short stories 
 Notes on the Cuffs (1923)
Diaboliad (1924)
The Fatal Eggs (1925)
A Young Doctor's Notebook (1926/1963)
Heart of a Dog (1925/1968) 
 "Morphine" (1927)
 "The Murderer" (1928)

Great Soviet Short Stories (1962)
The Terrible News: Russian Stories from the Years Following the Revolution (1990)
Diaboliad and Other Stories (1990) 
Notes on the Cuff & Other Stories (1991)
The Fatal Eggs and Other Soviet Satire, 1918–1963 (1993)

Theatre
 The Days of the Turbins (1926)
 Flight (1927)
 The Cabal of Hypocrites (1929)
 Ivan Vasilievich (1936)

Biography
Life of M. de Molière, 1962

Footnotes

References
 Voronina, Olga G., Depicting the Divine: Mikhail Bulgakov and Thomas Mann, Studies In Comparative Literature, 47 (Cambridge: Legenda, 2019).
Townsend, Dorian Aleksandra, From Upyr' to Vampire: The Slavic Vampire Myth in Russian Literature, Ph.D. Dissertation, School of German and Russian Studies, Faculty of Arts & Social Sciences, University of New South Wales, May 2011.

Sources

Biographies of Bulgakov 
  Michalopoulos, Dimitris, 2014, Russia under Communism: Bulgakov, his Life and his Book, Saarbruecken: Lambert Academic Publishing. 
Drawitz, Andrzey 2001. The Master and the Devil. transl. Kevin Windle, New York: Edwin Mellen.
Haber, Edythe C. 1998. Mikhail Bulgakov, the early years. Harvard University Press.
Milne, Leslie 1990. Mikhail Bulgakov: a critical biography. Cambridge University *Press.
Proffer, Ellendea 1984. Bulgakov: life and work. Ann Arbor: Ardis.
Proffer, Ellendea 1984. A pictorial biography of Mikhail Bulgakov. Ann Arbor: Ardis.
Wright, Colin 1978. Mikhail Bulgakov: life and interpretation. University of Toronto Press.

Letters, memoirs 
Belozerskaya-Bulgakova, Lyubov 1983. My life with Mikhail Bulgakov. transl. Margareta Thompson, Ann Arbor: Ardis.
Curtis J.A.E. 1991. Manuscripts don't burn: Mikhail Bulgakov: a life in letters and diaries. London: Bloomsbury.
Vozvdvizhensky, Vyacheslav (ed) 1990. Mikhail Bulgakov and his times: memoirs, letters. transl. Liv Tudge, Moscow: Progress.
Vanhellemont, Jan, 2020, The Master and Margarita - Annotations per chapter, Vanhellemont, Leuven, Belgium, 257 pp., https://www.masterandmargarita.eu/en/10estore/bookse.html .

External links

 
Full English text of The Master and Margarita
Full English text of The Heart of a Dog
Full English text of The Fatal Eggs
Full English translation of "Future Prospects" and "In the Café"
Master and Margarita profile and resources
Chris Hedges, Welcome to Satan's Ball, Truthdig, 10 March 2014. A comparison of the Soviet society described in Master and Margarita and modern society in the United States and Russia
Mikhail Bulgakov in the Western World: A Bibliography, Library of Congress, European Reading Room
"Remembering Gudok" by M.Bulgakov.  {from SovLit.net}

 

 
1891 births
1940 deaths
Writers from Kyiv
Physicians from Kyiv
Theatre people from Kyiv
People from Kiev Governorate
Russian male novelists
Russian satirists
Russian male dramatists and playwrights
Magic realism writers
Russian surgeons
Russian medical writers
People of the Russian Civil War
Russian male short story writers
Russian military doctors
Russian science fiction writers
Soviet novelists
Soviet male writers
20th-century Russian male writers
Soviet short story writers
20th-century Russian short story writers
Soviet dramatists and playwrights
Moscow Art Theatre
Modernist writers
Russian fantasy writers
Taras Shevchenko National University of Kyiv alumni
Deaths from nephritis
Burials at Novodevichy Cemetery
20th-century Russian dramatists and playwrights
20th-century Russian novelists